The Snowdon Theatre was a Streamline Moderne style cinema in Montreal, Quebec, Canada, located on Decarie Boulevard in the neighbourhood of Snowdon. After the theater closed, it was re-purposed as mini-shopping center with gymnastics studio, and then later demolished to build condominiums. Only its exterior facade partially survives.

History
The theater opened in February 1937 with a lavish art deco interior by designer Emmanuel Briffa, designer of the interior of the Rialto Theatre and 60 other cinemas in Canada.

In 1950 the entrance facade was modified and a new marquee was added. In 1968 it showed X-rated movies. In 1972 it screened Charlie Chaplin films for approximately an entire year. The cinema closed in May 1982 and was vacant. In 1990 it was re-purposed as a small shopping center. The 25,000 square foot interior was rebuilt by Rafid Louis and Emile Fattal, splitting the theater into two floors and sub-dividing the remaining space. The theater's original wall and ceiling art deco remained intact on the second floor, where a gymnastics center operated for a number of years. In 2013 the building was vacant again, then boarded up and left abandoned.

Demolition
The building was not a success with its retail shopping and offices and by the late 1990s was mostly vacant. Flexart Gymnastics, the last tenant, was evicted in late 2013 due to safety concerns with the building's roof. 

In January 2016, the city of Montreal, who owned the building, put it up for sale. On March 26, 2016 a fire on the second floor caused heavy damage to the roof. On May 4, 2017, the city found a buyer, who planned to demolish it for either a commercial or residential building project. The sale went through on February 3, 2018 for $1.6 million, with the only condition that the building's exterior front facade and sign be preserved.

In April 2019, the building was completely demolished, with only the front façade wall left standing and attached marquee (that had been modified in the late 80's with a French descriptor). As of April 2021, the condominiums are under construction and its remaining facade heavily modified.

References

External links
Photographs of surviving art deco elements at the Snowdon Theater
Photography Snowdon Theater 2015

Theatres in Montreal
Landmarks in Montreal
Former cinemas in Montreal
Streamline Moderne architecture in Canada
Côte-des-Neiges–Notre-Dame-de-Grâce
Burned buildings and structures in Canada